The Lady Grace Mysteries is a detective fiction series about escapades of Lady Grace Cavendish, a maid of honour to Queen Elizabeth I. The books are written in the style of a diary. Each book revolves around Lady Grace attempting to solve a mystery within the royal court. The stories are set in 1569 and 1570, and there are twelve books so far: Assassin, Betrayal, Conspiracy, Deception, Exile, Feud, Gold, Haunted, Intrigue, Jinx, Keys, and Loot. The first book, Assassin, was published in 2004.

Authors 
The first three books, Assassin, Betrayal, Conspiracy, and the later Feud, were written by Patricia Finney, while the other books are co-written by Sara Volger and Jan Burchett. All authors write under the pseudonym "Grace Cavendish".

Series
The series is written in alphabetical order, leading to hopes that there would be another 14 (M–Z); however, none have been published for the past 11 years.
 Assassin by Patricia Finney, Doubleday, 2004, 
 Betrayal by Patricia Finney, Doubleday, 2004, 
 Conspiracy by Patricia Finney, 2005
 Deception by Sara Volger & Jan Burchett, 2005
 Exile by Sara Vogler & Jan Burchett, 2006
 Feud by Patricia Finney, 2006
 Gold by Sara Vogler & Jan Burchett, 2006
 Haunted by Sara Vogler & Jan Burchett, 2006
 Intrigue by Sara Vogler & Jan Burchett, 2008
 Jinx by Sara Vogler & Jan Burchett, 2008
 Keys by Sara Vogler & Jan Burchett, 2009
 Loot by Sara Vogler & Jan Burchett, 2010

Characters
There are a number of recurring characters throughout the series while the main characters are Lady Grace Cavendish and Queen Elizabeth I.

Lady Grace Cavendish, Maid of Honour
Lady Grace Cavendish is the youngest Maid of Honour to Queen Elizabeth I. In the first book, Assassin, she is thirteen years old; by the eleventh, Keys, she is fifteen. She is the Queen's dearest goddaughter and rather a favourite with her at Court.

She is an orphan like her friends Ellie and Masou. Both her parents, especially her mother, play memorial roles in all the books and both died heroic, tragic deaths. Her father died when she was two, fighting a war in France, and her mother unintentionally drank poison intended for the Queen, put there by the Papist Guises.

Her best friends work at Whitehall Palace and follow the Queen on progress. Ellie Bunting, an orphaned laundry maid, and Masou Al-Ahmed, an African acrobat from Will Somer's acrobatic troupe, are both very close to Grace. However, they have to keep their friendship a secret due to the vast difference between their stations in life. The only time Grace mentions them is in her daybooke.

Sharp and clever, Grace always solves a new mystery in a short deadline and is quietly rewarded by the Queen. Grace has to keep her investigations a secret, but she nearly always informs Masou and Ellie, and they are her trusty friends who help her with the investigations when she needs a companion and they sometimes try to do some of their own investigation in their spare time. She is always very discreet about her being the Queen's Lady Pursuivant and her adventures are closely guarded secrets.

Grace never wants to get married as she wants to be like the Queen and stay at the Royal Court as long as she wishes to. However, in the 1st book (Assassin) she has three suitors, Lord Robert, Sir Gerald and her horse riding instructor Sir Charles. Fortunately, she does not have to marry one of them after a murder case when Sir Gerald is found dead with a knife in his back and Lord Robert is under suspicion.

Ever since the death of her beloved mother, Lady Margaret Cavendish, all of the Maids of Honour, Ladies in Waiting and especially the Queen (who was very close to Grace's mother) has been kind to her and took her on as a Maid of Honour at the age of twelve.

Unlike all the other Maids of Honour, Lady Grace loves to climb trees in orchards when she walks the dogs. In Whitehall, she mainly climbs a cherry tree that reminds her of her mother. When Grace walks the Queen's dogs, she always goes to visit her friends Masou and Ellie in a hideout. Every time the Queen wants to move to another Palace, Masou and Ellie find a little hideaway in the orchard to go in there in their spare time, when they are not helping Lady Grace solve a new mystery.

The thing that Grace hates is when Ellie and Masou have to treat her like a Maid of Honour, and call her "mistress" and "lady". When Masou does, he performs elaborate bows. Grace states she always finds it hard not to laugh when he does.

Queen Elizabeth

Elizabeth I (7 September 1533 – 24 March 1603) was Queen of England and Ireland from 17 November 1558 until her death in early 1603. Sometimes called "The Virgin Queen", "Gloriana", or "Good Queen Bess", Elizabeth was the fifth and last monarch of the Tudor dynasty.

Elizabeth was the daughter of King Henry VIII and Queen Anne Boleyn. Elizabeth was born a princess, but her mother, Anne Boleyn, was executed three years after her birth on false accusations of treason, heresy, witchcraft and infidelity, and through her mother's disgrace Elizabeth was declared illegitimate.

In 1558 Elizabeth succeeded her half-sister, the devoutly Catholic Mary I of England, during whose reign she had been imprisoned for nearly a year on suspicion of supporting Protestant rebels. It was a difficult time for Elizabeth. She was known to take a diamond from her jewels and scratch into a Tower window the words,

"Much suspected of me, nothing proved can be, quote Elizabeth, prisoner."

She was a very fond and helping godmother and guardian to Lady Grace, but whether or not that's true in real life nobody knows the truth. She was certainly a devoted and protective woman to her Ladies-in-Waiting and Maids of Honour.

Dr Cavendish

Dr Cavendish is Grace's loving uncle and the head physician at Court. He is a fond uncle of Grace and one of her only relatives. He is very upset by Grace's mother's death and for many years after the tragedy he is known to be lost in his own world.

He is usually in one of two states – drunk or hung over. Despite all this he loves Grace very dearly and Grace is very fond of him and loves him a lot more than she realizes. Dr Cavendish is always careful to upgrade Grace's physical state and regularly check her health standards.

Olwen and Fran

Olwen is Lady Sarah's tiring woman. She is kind and cheerful and comforts Lady Sarah when Sarah is upset. In Betrayal, Olwen is abducted, threatened, tied up, treated despicably, and used as hostage to lure Lady Sarah unwittingly into abduction too.

Cruel Captain Derby, Olwen's captor, threatens to cut off Olwen's hands if Lady Sarah refuses to marry him, and throws her into the brig. Naturally, this is the cause of much distress for both Olwen and Lady Sarah.

Fran is Mary Shelton's tiring woman. She is not mentioned much in the series and she also helps Lady Grace along with Olwen.

Penelope Knollys, Carmina Willoughby and Lucy Throckmorton

Penelope Knollys is one of Grace's fellow Maids of Honour. She follows the Queen on progress and shares a bedroom with Lady Jane Coningsby and Carmina Willoughby. Penelope always cowers away from the antics of Lady Sarah Bartelmy and Lady Jane Coningsby. Penelope is quite small and plain, and always follows Lady Sarah and her advice on clothes. In Book 7, Gold, Penelope gets married, thus leaving the Queen's service.

Carmina is bright and bouncy. In Feud, she suffers from poisoning from Orpiment, given to her by Lady Horsely for revenge on her son's accidental death through jousting. Also, after the crisis of a fire at St Bartholemhew's Fair in Smith Field, Book 10, Jinx, she becomes very superstitious and jumpy, full of dire warnings. She is friends with Lucy Throckmorton and loves having a good chatter over a mystery, she and Lucy both share the love of gossip.

Lucy Throckmorton is a terrible gossip. She appears to replace Penelope after her marriage and is not in all the books - considerably startles some readers by popping up suddenly in Book 10! Lucy is best friends with Carmina, gossips all the time and likes having long, boring, detailed conversations about sleeves and gowns in the latest styles.

Ellie Bunting
Ellie is a laundry maid at Queen Elizabeth's court, who later in the series (the book Haunted) becomes Lady Grace's tiring woman by way of reward for an act of bravery in defeating a villain in broad daylight, in front of the rest of the Court.

She is very good friends with Grace and Masou and she often assists them in solving the hardest of mysteries. Ellie is very superstitious - in Jinx and Haunted she insists upon carting a massive bag of amulets around with her, even when sailing down the Thames and walking the dogs through muddy fields! She is very considerate, as looks are concerned she is thin as she is fed little. She has brown hair and a rounded face with many scars.

Like her friends Grace and Masou, she is an orphan as her parents died of the sickly plague. In Feud, she talks about how her parents died, pushing back tears as she shows Grace the scars on her neck.

The deputy laundress, Mrs. Fadget, treats Ellie badly, forcing her to work long hours without a break, and tries to suck up to Grace when Grace visits the laundry to make up excuses to drag Ellie out of her work to talk to her. (These excuses often involve numerous unwashed chemises and precious silk handkerchiefs that need scrubbing from ink stains.) In the second book, Betrayal, Mrs. Fadget treats Ellie so badly she gets quinsey. While Grace is on a Captain Drake's ship, Mary Shelton cares for Ellie until Grace comes back with Lady Sarah. By that time Ellie is much better.

In Exile, Book 5, Ellie is falsely accused of stealing the Heart of Kings. The Heart of Kings is the most famed and fabled jewel in the world and is the most treasured possession of the Court's noble foreign visitor (Banoo Yasmine from Sharkand, A.K.A. The Holy Lands). Luckily Ellie is proved innocent and Grace is the one to give out the "good tidings".

Ellie is later upgraded to tiring woman after she catches a criminal and she takes great care and time with Grace's hair and appearance and often accompanies her on her missions.

Masou al-Ahmed
Masou is a Muslim boy and a skilled tumbler in Queen Elizabeth's court. Like Ellie, he is rewarded later in the series and becomes one of the Queen's very own Fools after performing an act of bravery. He is good friends with Grace and Ellie and helps them solve mysteries. When Lady Sarah was captured by Captain Derby in Betrayal, Masou helps Lady Grace save her and her tiring woman Olwen. Masou is from Africa and never knew his mother, who died at his birth. His father died of consumption after arriving in England when he was very young. He is cheeky, fun and boastful about his skills. He is especially good at juggling with fire. In the third book, Conspiracy, Masou looks after Gypsy Pete when he was hurt by a firework. He likes to try and scare the girls and in Haunted, Grace says it is the first time she has seen him speechless (when he is granted the honor of Court Fool, and quickly becomes the Queen's favourite).

Lady Sarah Bartelmy

Lady Sarah Bartelmy is one of Grace's fellow Maids of Honour and shares a bedchamber with Grace. She is two years older than Grace and is a lively and flirtatious girl. She is exceedingly picky over her makeup and hair and drives her chambermaids mad with her constant fussing over pearls and hair arrangements. She is the wealthiest of all the Maids of Honour and spends a month wearing every gown before begging for a new one.

Not much is known about Lady Sarah's past, childhood or family except that she is an exceedingly wealthy young heiress and her family owns a large estate called Bartelmy House a hundred miles away from the Queen's residence.
 
Lady Sarah is very pretty, with becoming copper coloured locks and a large bosom. She is the poor Maid of Honour who has to sit for hours on end while the Queen's artist paints her because Queen Elizabeth has no time to spare. She also pretends to be the Queen at a masque where the Queen plays a cunning prank on her courtiers.

In the second book, Lady Sarah and her tiring woman Olwen are captured by Captain Derby.

Lady Sarah's enemy at Court is her fellow Maid of Honour Lady Jane Coningsby. In Deception Sarah creates a rude rhyme mocking Lady Jane's lack of skating technique, which she sings in front of six young gentlemen, a large congregation and Lady Jane. Grace writes it down in her daybooke. Lady Jane then sings one back about three large spots (interpretative the 'three blind mice'), staring at Lady Sarah whilst singing it. They constantly vie each other for the most men following them

After the tenth book, Lady Sarah is being wooed by a Gentleman of the Guards named Daniel Cheshire. He writes love poetry for her, which she receives very happily, and by the end of the twelfth book they are hand-fasted to wed. They are extremely happy together.

Lady Jane Coningsby

Lady Jane Coningsby is a new Maid of Honour at Whitehall Palace who took the place of a banished Maid of Honour, Katharine Broke, who was sent home in disgrace after a scandal with the Duke of Norkfolk's young nephew. Lady Jane is not the most popular amongst the other Maids of Honour.

Lady Jane's number one enemy at Court is Lady Sarah Bartelmy, her fellow Maid of Honour. They both despise each other. Since Lady Jane lately came to Court, she has had countless squabbles with arrogant Lady Sarah. Lady Jane despises Lady Sarah, and fights with her almost constantly. She is always searching for ways to outdo Lady Sarah in gaining the attention of the young gentlemen.

Lady Jane is very pretty, as is her rival Sarah Bartelmy. Jane has an exceedingly tall elegant figure and long, carefully styled blonde ringlets 'foaming down her back', as one of the dafter court gentlemen wrote in a poem.

Her father was the ambassador to the French Court at one time, so she gives herself fancy airs and graces. Jane often uses her eloquently superior way of public speaking to demean her rival Lady Sarah and update herself as supposedly the most beautiful and attractive of all the Maids at Court.

Jane also thinks she knows more about fashion than anyone else because the French Court was so fashionable at the time her father was ambassador and wears a lot of French-style apparel. She is very jumpy about her clothes and her reputation for her beauty. Every other Maid of Honour is very fed up of Lady Jane and Lady Sarah quarrelling.

Like many other Maids of Honour and Ladies in Waiting at the Court of Queen Elizabeth I, Jane's dreams are to find a man of money and rank to marry. She has a love of flirting, and uses her reputation of ultimate beauty to propel and strengthen that love.

In Betrayal, Lady Jane is jealous of Lady Sarah because Lady Sarah attracts two piratical but nevertheless gallant, flirtatious, generous, handsome, dashing young sea captains to her beauty and wealth on a visit to Tillbury Docks while Jane herself, who constantly considers herself ultimately beautiful, is positively ignored, even when she deliberately steps into a muddy puddle wearing her best shoes, simply in the hope of attracting a little attention from Captain Drake and Captain Derby.

Jane is very attractive and has a little group of young courtiers following her, wherever she goes. Jane constantly complains that Lady Sarah has all the gentlemen to herself, but despite her steadfast complaints, she does know that men of the Court go positively moony over her for a range of different reasons: her flirtatious manner, her beauty, and her wealth, the fact that she is an heiress, that she is exceedingly well-born, and that she has wealthy parents.

In the 12th book, Loot, before the celebrations for the Queen's 12th year on the throne, Lady Jane and Lady Sarah have a fight over who gets to wear a crimson velvet dress. They have a tug of war, suggested by Lady Sarah, over it which results in Lady Jane ripping the dress in half.

Mary Shelton

Mary Shelton is a  Maid of Honour at the Court. She has been very kind to Lady Grace since Grace's mother died. When Ellie is sick with quinsy and Lady Sarah appears to have run off with a piratical sea captain, Mary stays at Whitehall and nurses Ellie. Meanwhile, Grace is away at sea with her hair cut short, pretending to be a boy.

Mary is not entirely clueless about Grace's secret role at Whitehall Palace as Lady Pursuivant, and is Grace's sidekick when necessary. However, she never questions Grace's activities.

Mary is quiet, loving, gentle and friendly. She loves to gossip and hates climbing trees and walking the dogs. She doesn't like mice. As Grace quotes in her daybooke,

"She doesn't like mice, rats or lizards, or any small scuttly creature for that matter, but at least she has some sense."

Mary Shelton is not entitled to the qualifications of the title 'Lady', but she was well-born enough to serve the Queen, which in turn gave her a decent position at Court in the Queen's favour.

Mary has many nieces and nephews, as well as many friends and relatives. Little is known of Mary's possible background, but we think her mother is dead and she is possibly an orphan.

In real life Mary Shelton did exist and after a while became the Lady of the Bedchamber to Queen Elizabeth I, a great honour.

She was well known for being irritating, and was once slapped across the cheek by the Queen herself, a happening proven by historical evidence!

Mr Daniel Cheshire

Mr Daniel Cheshire is Lady Sarah's suitor. He is a member of the Gentlemen's Guard at Court and has rank and wealth. He is tall, slim, young and handsome with reddish-blonde hair.

In Book 10, Jinx, Lady Sarah is badly burned in a fire, but Daniel Cheshire remains steadfast and ever loyal to her, bringing trinkets, gifts and love poetry. It is this which convinces Grace that Daniel Cheshire is a truly good and worthy suitor.

They are in love by the end of Book 10, and by the end of Book 12 they are formally handfasted to be married.

Will Somers
Will Somers is the Queen's fool and head of the Queen's troupe. He is Masou's boss and Masou often makes excuses to him so that he can discreetly slip out to Grace.

Somers runs the troupe and produces acts for the Queen and her Court, especially at large feasts. He and his troupe entertain the Queen in her Presence Chamber. Will Somers was actually a real person and he was Henry VIII's personal 'fool' as well as Elizabeth 1st. He is not mentioned too much in the books.

Mrs Champernowne
Mrs Champernowne is in charge of the Maids of Honour. She is strict and often reprimands Grace; in Assassin, Grace is out at night once, and Mrs. Champernowne threatens to spank, or "birch" Grace. However, when one of the Maids of Honour is ill, she takes good care of them. She is a very important character throughout the series.

Mrs Champernowne was a real person, unlike some of the characters in the Lady Grace Mysteries. She looked after Queen Elizabeth I as a baby. In Feud, she reveals unknowingly, the last clue to the mystery of Carmina's poisoning to Grace. She hates it when Grace climbs trees and run down the corridors because she believes it is not "lady like".
Mrs Champernowne is Welsh, and Grace states that she has a sing-song voice.

Mr Hatton
Mr Hatton is the head of the Gentlemen Guard. He often makes the arrests after Lady Grace has solved a mystery. He considers Lady Grace to be a silly Maid of Honour who always gets in the way for example, in deception when Grace goes with Mr Hatton she gets throttled with a knife. Sometimes, Mr Hatton is too rash and arrests the wrong person because of what seems obvious – one example is in book 11 Keys when he wrongly accuses the clockmaker's apprentice for murdering Mr Urseau.

He loves the Queen in the stories.

Book Synopses

Assassin 
Lady Grace Cavendish, an orphaned Maid of Honour to Queen Elizabeth I, must choose between three suitors that the Queen has chosen for her. In her heart, Grace doesn't want to marry any of them - it's merely a forced choice between ancient Sir Charles, snooty, bullying Sir Gerald and penniless, tongue-tied Lord Robert. However, disaster soon strikes - one of her suitors is found murdered and another is apparently guilty! Lady Grace is unconvinced and seeks to find the true killer with the help of her loyal friends, Ellie the laundrymaid and Masou the acrobat. In the hustle and bustle of the Elizabethan Court, our heroine must solve her first mystery, hindered by false trails and the limited privacy that comes with her status. But being the Queen's favorite maid of honour means life isn't always easy and sometimes the most useless things come in as quite useful.

Betrayal 
A trip to the docks to visit the handsome sea captain Sir Francis Drake sets the Court in a flutter, and when Grace's fellow Maid of Honour, the vain Sarah Bartelmy mysteriously disappears, Lady Grace assumes that she has run away to marry the pirate captain. However, a trail of clues leads the Lady Pursuivant to suspect a kidnapping! With the help of her tumbler friend Masou, she stows away on Drake's ship, determined to save her friend's reputation. After a few minutes of the day, you could see it and then you could get it. When Lady Grace was a really good one, yesterday we made it.

Conspiracy 
Queen Elizabeth I flees London for the summer, avoiding the outbursts of plague, and takes herself and her Court off to the sleepy English countryside, where village after village welcome and honour the Queen as their blessed sovereign and queen. When they get to the grand country home of Lord Robert Dudley, the Queen's lost love, the grand Swedish Prince Sven has come to court the Queen, to Lord Robert's disgust. In the flurry of excitement, Grace finds herself being ardently courted by one of Lord Robert's henchmen, who also speaks Swedish. That night, in the midst of entertainment, bad luck seems to haunt the Queen. Saddles on horses slip, statues collapse and fireworks go awry, injuring a little boy. Grace plunges for the third time into the hustle and bustle of Queen Elizabeth's Court as she tries to unravel the mystery of the murderous intent of a hidden presence. No-one is beyond suspicion, and Grace knows she cannot let anyone pull the wool over her eyes.

Deception 
Six months have passed and snow lies thick upon the ground as Queen Elizabeth's favourite goddaughter paces through the palace, desperate to attend the Frost Fair. A temper tantrum from the Queen sends the Maids and Ladies fleeing the palace, determined to see the fair. But their evening is ruined when a strangled corpse is found upon the ice, with two of the Queen's new coins bound to his eyes. The Maids are rushed back to the palace in a state of emergency, leaving Grace with yet another mystery to explore. Her searches for justice take her all over London and beyond, to find a most unlikely villain...

Exile 
Spring is inching forwards and the wondrous Banoo Yasmine has come to Court, begging for a loan from Queen Elizabeth. The Court is bewitched by the exotic wonders of the beautiful young woman and one of Grace's closest friends begins yearning after the Banoo's approval. When the Banoo Yasmine's most precious possession goes missing, guards scramble through the palace in the vain hope of overturning the jewel. Suddenly the shout goes up that the Heart of Kings ruby has been found! Everyone rejoices, including Grace, until she asks after the thief's name. In horror, she learns that the finger has been pointed at one of her best friends. In proving Ellie Bunting's innocence, Grace crashes through the castle and Court, earning a record for clumsiness and finding a lot more as well...

Feud 
The Court painters have arrived and the Queen is too busy to pose for paintings, so Sarah Bartelmy takes her place. Lady Grace is fascinated by the painters and their skill, when suddenly a friend of hers falls dangerously, mysteriously ill. Grace suspects that it is not a natural illness, but a botched assassination attempt... or was it botched? Scrambling through the palace, Lady Grace finds out a devastating truth that changes the very way she looks at the rest of her fellow courtiers forever...

Gold 
One of the Queen's Maid of Honour is getting married. However, the preparations are interrupted when Her Majesty's gold is stolen! Another mystery for the secret Lady Pursuivant. But Lady Grace doesn't only have to deal with this mystery but she also develops feelings for the good-looking Lord Ruxbury, which makes it hard to believe that he could be the thief...Will she and her trusty friends Ellie and Masou be able to uncover the fortune?

Haunted 
The court is spending the summer at a noblemen's estate where a new manor house is being built. But when a spooky figure, apparently the ghost of the first Earl, appears there is a big uproar, and Lady Grace has to pursue the Queen to stay at the manor for a few more days, so that she can solve the mystery, because she is sure the ghost is only an impostor. An impostor who is aiming to destroy the nobleman's dreams and his manor. Assisted by her friends Lady Grace uncovers the ghost's real identity along with a bit of the manor's history.

Intrigue 
A new play: Inrigue, is just about to open in Whitehall. The play includes a very clever, convincing death scene, and the Queen is desperate to see it before the rest of her country. But when the Queen goes to watch, the death scene is far too convincing - in fact, it's real! Richard Fitzgrey has just been murdered in front of the Queen. Grace finds as many opportunities as possible to investigate this dramatic death. She discovers that the motives for Richard's murder are more complicated than she first thought. Can Grace, Masou and Ellie solve the crime before an innocent man is punished.

Keys 
When the Queen's clockmaker, Mr. Urseau is found dead in his workshop with a dagger in his chest and a key clutched in his hand the finger is pointed to his apprentice. But Lady Cavendish is certain he is not the murder. Who would have possibly wanted the royal clockmaker dead? What are these secret meetings Mr. Urseau had been attending to? And does the key have anything to do with his death? When Grace finds out that the dagger was not intended for Mr Urseau's chest but the Queen's, she is resolved to find the villain as soon as possible.

Loot 
It has been twelve years since Elizabeth I was crowned England's Queen. The whole court is alive with the celebrations and many foreign visitors have come to see the monarch wear the famous Crown Jewels. But when the crown of St Edward is stolen from a guarded room, it is up to Lady Grace, Ellie and Masou to find the thief and make sure the foreign guests are not disappointed. Will the daring Lady Pursuivant find the villain before Her Majesty is publicly humiliated...?

Reviews
 https://web.archive.org/web/20071204164002/http://blogcritics.org/archives/2006/09/27/190315.php
 http://www.kidsreads.com/series/series-lady-grace-titles.asp

Mystery novels by series
Children's historical novels
Children's mystery novels
Historical mystery novels
2000s children's books
Fictional historical detectives